Harefield is a village in the London Borough of Hillingdon, England,  northwest of Charing Cross near Greater London's boundary with Buckinghamshire to the west and Hertfordshire to the north. The population at the 2011 Census was 7,399. Harefield is the westernmost settlement in Greater London.

Harefield is near Denham, Ickenham, Northwood, Rickmansworth, Ruislip and Uxbridge. Pioneering heart surgery techniques were developed at Harefield Hospital.

History
Two sites near Dewes Farm have produced late Mesolithic artefacts. Harefield enters recorded history through the Domesday Book (1086) as Herefelle, comprising the Anglo-Saxon words Here "[danish] army" (c.f. the English fyrd) and felle (later feld), "field". Before the Norman conquest of England, the Manor of Harefield belonged to Countess Goda, the sister of Edward the Confessor. Her husbands were French, Dreux of the Vexin and Count Eustace of Boulogne.

Following the Norman conquest, ownership of Harefield passed to Richard FitzGilbert, the son of Count Gilbert of Brionne. It was listed in the Domesday Book as comprising enough arable land for five ploughs, with meadow land only sufficient for one plough. Woodland areas in Middlesex were registered in the number of pigs which could be supported there; Harefield had 1,200, the second highest in the Hundred of Elthorne to Ruislip, with 1,500. Ten villeins (tenants) are also counted; they held their land freely from the lord in exchange for rent payments and labour. By the 12th or 13th century their land is believed to have passed back to the lord and become unfree. There were also seven bordars (poorer tenants) with five acres each, while one had three. In addition, three cottars, who owned a cottage and garden, also feature.

Harefield was eventually split into the main manor of Harefield, and the two smaller submanors of Brackenbury and Moorhall. It had been owned by the Clares, descended from Richard FitzGerald, before passing to the Batchworths by 1235. In turn, the Swanlord family took possession in 1315. By 1446, the Newdigate family owned Harefield - they still owned some land in the 1920s. John Newdigate exchanged most of his land in 1585 with the Chief Justice of the Court of Common Pleas, Sir Edmund Anderson. He sold the manor to Sir Thomas Egerton, who staged an elaborate entertainment for Queen Elizabeth in 1602.

During World War I, Harefield Park was used as an Australian military hospital. The bodies of the servicemen who died there were buried with full military honours within the graveyard of St Mary's Church; the area, which also included the ground where the Harefield Place building stood, became a military cemetery.

In 1929 Harefield became part of the Municipal Borough of Uxbridge, then in 1965 the London Borough of Hillingdon.

Notable buildings

Harefield Hospital
Harefield Hospital is a world-famous heart and lung hospital. It is part of the Royal Brompton & Harefield NHS Foundation Trust, the largest specialist heart and lung centre in the UK, and among the largest in Europe. Its sister hospital in the trust is the Royal Brompton Hospital in Chelsea.

Sir Magdi Yacoub, consultant cardiothoracic surgeon at Harefield Hospital (1969–2002), carried out the first live lobe lung transplant, and went on to perform more transplants than any other surgeon in the world. By the end of the 1980s Harefield Hospital was the leading transplant centre. Magdi Yacoub was involved in the development of heart and heart-lung transplants.

St Mary the Virgin Church
St Mary's Parish Church (off Church Hill) is Harefield's oldest building and an important focal point for the Harefield community. A priest is first mentioned in the manor of Harefield in the Domesday Book (1086). In the late 12th century the advowson was given to the Knights Hospitallers, although the Newdigate family later became patrons of the church. The church building has some medieval features, but was restored and altered in 1768, and again in 1841.

The church cemetery contains the graves of over 100 soldiers of the First Australian Imperial Force who died at No. 1 Australian Auxiliary Hospital (Harefield Park Hospital) after being wounded in World War I. The hospital became Harefield prior to World War II. Each year on Anzac Day a commemoration service is attended by local dignitaries, representatives from the Australian and New Zealand governments, local school children and many retired servicemen.  Following the church service the congregation move to the cemetery and form around the Anzac memorial. The last post and reveille are played, followed by a wreath-laying ceremony. Local school children also place flowers on the well-kept grave sites.

The church holds the tomb in which Alice Stanley, Dowager Countess of Derby was laid to rest in January 1637. Dowager Stanley was a Spencer, from Althorp in Northamptonshire, of the family to which Diana Princess of Wales belonged. She was the widow of Ferdinando, 5th Earl of Derby, who had been poisoned because of his closeness to the throne of England. Very soon after Ferdinando's murder in 1594 Alice had to move out of Lathom and Knowsley in Lancashire. She came to live at Harefield Place in considerable splendour. The house stood to the south of the present church and parts of its moat and brickwork can still be seen.

Alice, Dowager Countess of Derby was also Dowager Viscountess Brackley. Her second husband Thomas Egerton, Lord Ellesmere, an eminent lawyer and Lord Chancellor of England, had died in 1617. But the Derby title was the one she preferred to be known by, and it is the one by which she is described on her funeral monument, which is surely one of the finest of its time anywhere in England. The mourning daughters beside the tomb are not meant to be lifelike representations of her actual daughters, Anne, Frances and Elizabeth; they conform to a stereotype often observed on grand monuments of this kind. But the figure of Alice Countess of Derby is probably closer to historical reality. She wears the coronet of a Countess, not a Viscountess, and at the foot of her tomb is a coroneted eagle, a reminder of the Stanleys' armorial crest. This commemorates their descent from the Lathoms, which was the foundation of their fortunes.

Sir Michael Shersby, MP for Uxbridge from 1972 to 1997, is buried in the churchyard along with his widow Lady Barbara.

Manor of Harefield

The ancient Manor of Harefield was held by the Newdigate family from about 1440. The old Manor house, Harefield Place, adjacent to St Mary the Virgin church, was replaced in 1786, when a new mansion house was built at Harefield Lodge. The old 'Harefield Place' fell into disrepair and was demolished in 1813, whereupon the new Manor house became known as Harefield Place. It was sold by Charles Newdigate Newdegate in 1877. In 1938 it was acquired by the local authority to serve as a hospital. In 1959 the land was redeveloped and is now the Harefield Place Golf Club.

Harefield House, a Grade II listed building, High Street, Harefield, was built by Sir Roger Newdigate in about 1750. From about 1765 to 1809 it was occupied by J. M. Bruhl. During World War I it served as No. 1 Australian Auxiliary Hospital. In 1937 it was acquired by the Ministry of Defence and was occupied by the Aeronautical Inspection Directorate. After 1982 the building was restored and converted to office use. In 2015 the building was used as the filming location for the interior of the island mansion in the TV adaptation of Agatha Christie's mystery novel And Then There Were None.

Breakspear House (Breakspears), a Grade 1 listed building, originally constructed in the 17th century also falls within Harefield.

The Harefield Academy
The Harefield Academy replaced the John Penrose School in September 2005. The new academy is an age 11 to 18 school with accommodation for 750 students aged 11 to 15 and a further 250 post-16 students.

The School is set in the village of Harefield on the edge of the green belt and is adjacent to the commencement of agricultural land.

The Department for Children, Schools and Families (DCSF), a number of directors of Watford Football Club, and the London Borough of Hillingdon worked together to seek to bring about a significant improvement in educational and health standards.

The Harefield Academy project is part of the Government's Academies initiative.

Sport
Harefield is home to Harefield United Football Club, which was founded in 1868 and is the oldest in Middlesex.

Harefield is home to Harefield Cricket Club, whose first and second teams play their matches at the Woods Cricket Ground on Breakspear Road North. In 2008, however, the Dairy Farm Ground (behind the current first team pitch) was opened in order to accommodate the third and fourth XIs. This was done in conjunction with the Harefield Parochial Charity. In 2009, the first XI achieved promotion to the Home Counties Cricket League, and are therefore one division away from the highest level of club cricket in England and Wales. In 2010, HCC had the most successful season in its history, with the second, third & fourth XI's all winning their respective leagues. The Sunday Academy side won their division of the Chess Valley League. The 2014 season saw the first XI play their first season in the Premier Division and after a protracted relegation battle, they survived on the last game of season. A second season in the top flight secured their status as the highest ranked club in the area.

Harefield is also home to an Elite Gymnastics Academy. The Harefield Academy, Northwood Road, opened in September 2005 on the John Penrose School site.

Victoria Cross recipients
Harefield is associated with three recipients of the Victoria Cross. Two booklets in the Reference section of Harefield library give details of the three recipients of the award.

 Lieutenant-General Gerald Goodlake VC (1832–1890), who served with the Coldstream Guards in the Crimean War, is buried in St Mary's parish churchyard.
 Private Cecil John Kinross VC (1896–1957), who distinguished himself at Passchendaele in World War I, was born in Harefield; he moved with his family in 1912 to Lougheed, Alberta.
 Sergeant Robert Edward Ryder VC (1895–1978), who served in World War I in the Middlesex Regiment, was born and is buried in Harefield. A blue plaque on The Old Workhouse marks his birthplace.

A gold plaque in the Royal British Legion Hall honours the exceptional bravery of both Goodlake VC and Ryder VC. In 2011, Hillingdon Council erected a blue plaque in honour of the courage of Kinross VC at the place of his birth on the anniversary of his birthday, 17 February.

Other notable people

 Rhodes Boyson (1925–2012), Conservative Member of Parliament
 Brian Connolly (1945–1997), singer of glam rock band Sweet grew up in Harefield and Hayes from the age of 12
 Thomas Egerton, Lord Ellesmere (1540–1617) and wife Alice Spencer (1559–1637), lived in Harefield from 1601; Queen Elizabeth I visited the couple in July 1602
 Alexander Fleming (1881–1955), biologist and Nobel Prize winner for the discovery of penicillin, was Regional Pathologist at Harefield Hospital, 1939; this is recorded on a blue plaque at the main entrance door to the hospital
 Russell Grant (born 1951), TV astrologer, grew up in Harefield and was head chorister at St Mary's parish church
 Politician Charles Newdigate (1816–1887), lived in Harefield, and was buried in Harefield Church, which he had personally spent much money restoring
 Judge Sir Richard Newdigate (1602–1678), lived in Harefield, and was buried in Harefield parish church, where a monument was raised to his memory
 Henry Avray Tipping (1855–1933), designed and built Little Hammonds in Breakspear Road North. Tipping was architectural editor of Country Life magazine and was responsible for the layout of the garden at Chequers
 Thomas Wakley (1795–1862), medical and social reformer, and founder of The Lancet, lived at Harefield Park, 1845–1856; he has a memorial stone in the grounds of Harefield Hospital

Transport
Although there is no eponymous tube or railway station in Harefield, buses in the area link to Northwood and Uxbridge tube stations and Denham and Rickmansworth railway stations.

Buses
Harefield is served by route 331 operating between Uxbridge and Ruislip, and route U9 between Uxbridge and Harefield Hospital.

Nearest Underground stations
Moor Park
Northwood
Rickmansworth
Uxbridge
Ickenham

Nearest railway stations
 Denham
 Rickmansworth

References

External links

 Harefield Park Hospital, Australian War Memorial, 11 June 1974

Areas of London
Districts of the London Borough of Hillingdon
Villages in London
Places formerly in Middlesex